This is a Bibliography of World War II battles and campaigns in East Asia, South East Asia and the Pacific. It aims to include the major theaters, campaigns and battles of the Asia-Pacific Theater of World War II. It is part of Wikipedia's larger effort to document the Bibliography of World War II. Its counterpart for the European, North African and Middle Eastern theater is the Bibliography of World War II battles and campaigns in Europe, North Africa and the Middle East.

Bibliography

Second Sino-Japanese War (1937–1945)

Pacific War (1941–1945), general

Attack on Pearl Harbor (1941)

Battle of Hong Kong (1941)

Malayan campaign (1941–1942)

1st Philippines campaign (1941–1942)

Burma campaign (1941–1945)

Dutch East Indies campaign (1941–1942)

Battle of the Coral Sea (1942)

New Guinea campaign (1942–1945)

Aleutian islands campaign (1942–1943)

Battle of Midway (1942)

Guadalcanal campaign (1942–1943)

Battle of the Bismarck Sea (1943)

2nd Philippines campaign (1944–1945)

Battle of Leyte Gulf (October 1944)

Battle of Iwo Jima (1945)

Battle of Okinawa (1945)

Atomic bombings of Hiroshima and Nagasaki (1945) 

 
 
 
 
 
  — Alternate title: Japan Subdued: The Atomic Bomb and the End of the War in the Pacific
 
 
 
 
 
 
 
  This work also won a Pulitzer Prize. Available at: online.

See also 

 Bibliography of World War II
 Bibliography of World War II battles and campaigns in Europe, North Africa and the Middle East
East Asian and Pacific Theater